Lucius Wolcott Hitchcock (1868–1942) was an American artist, illustrator and educator, known for his paintings.

About 
Lucius Wolcott Hitchcock was born 1868 in Ohio. He studied at Art Students League of New York and studied at Académie Julian in Paris, with artists Jules Joseph Lefebvre, Benjamin Constant, and Jean Paul Laurens.

Hitchcock worked as an illustrator for Harper's Bazaar magazine, Scribner's Magazine, Woman's Home Companion, among other publications.

In 1894, he moved to Buffalo, New York, where he led the Art Students' League of Buffalo. Hitchcock was known for his figure and portrait painting. A year later in 1895, he married Sarah Hyde McNeil of Akron, Ohio, and together the couple lived in Buffalo. He remained teaching at Art Students' League of Buffalo for a decade.

In 1905, Hitchcock moved to New York City to teach at Chase School of Art (now known as Parson School of Design).

He was a member of the Buffalo Society of Artists, the Society of Illustrators, Salmagundi Club, and the New Rochelle Art Association.

Hitchcock died at age 73 after a long illness, in New Rochelle, New York in 1942.

Publications 
A select list of books published with Hitchcock's illustrations, in descending order by year published.

References

External links 

 Lucius Wolcott Hitchcock on AskArt.com

1868 births
1942 deaths
Académie Julian alumni
Art Students' League of Buffalo alumni
Parsons School of Design faculty
American magazine illustrators
Artists from New York City
People from New Rochelle, New York
Art Students League of New York alumni